Nima Saghafi (born January 24, 1990) is an American soccer referee in Major League Soccer and member of PRO.

Career
Saghafi made his MLS center referee debut on March 20, 2016 in a match between the Philadelphia Union and New England Revolution. He made his international debut on October 16, 2018 in the 2019–20 CONCACAF Nations League qualifying match between Guadeloupe and Aruba. Saghafi was a finalist for the MLS Referee of the Year Award and was selected as the fourth official in the 2018 MLS Cup.

References

External links
  (archive)
 

1990 births
Living people
American soccer referees
American people of Iranian descent
Sportspeople of Iranian descent
Major League Soccer referees